
Gmina Rościszewo is a rural gmina (administrative district) in Sierpc County, Masovian Voivodeship, in east-central Poland. Its seat is the village of Rościszewo, which lies approximately 9 kilometres (5 mi) north-east of Sierpc and 112 km (69 mi) north-west of Warsaw

Villages
Gmina Rościszewo contains the villages and settlements of Babiec Piaseczny, Babiec Rżały, Babiec-Więczanki, Borowo, Bryski, Komorowo, Kownatka, Kuski, Lipniki, Łukomie, Łukomie-Kolonia, Nowe Rościszewo, Nowy Zamość, Ostrów, Pianki, Polik, Puszcza, Rościszewo, Rumunki-Chwały, Rzeszotary-Chwały, Rzeszotary-Gortaty, Rzeszotary-Pszczele, Rzeszotary-Stara Wieś, Rzeszotary-Zawady, Śniedzanowo, Stopin, Topiąca, Września and Zamość.

Neighbouring gminas
Gmina Rościszewo is bordered by the town of Sierpc and by the gminas of Bieżuń, Lutocin, Sierpc, Skrwilno, Szczutowo and Zawidz.

References
Polish official population figures 2006

Rosciszewo
Sierpc County